is a sub-kilometer near-Earth object and potentially hazardous asteroid of the Aten group, approximately  in diameter. It was discovered on 17 September 2006, by the Catalina Sky Survey at Catalina Station in Arizona. The stony A/S-type asteroid is highly elongated in shape and has a rotation period of 11.5 hours.

Orbit and classification 

 orbits the Sun at a distance of 0.7–1.2 AU once every 11 months (338 days; semi-major axis of 0.95 AU). Its orbit has an eccentricity of 0.28 and an inclination of 6° with respect to the ecliptic. The body's observation arc begins with its official discovery observation at Catalina Station in September 2006.

Close approaches 

In order to be classified as "potentially hazardous" an object must have an Earth-MOID of less than  – approximately 19.5 lunar distances – and an absolute magnitude brighter than 22, approximately corresponding to a diameter above .

This is the object's closest flyby in JPL's data base, which covers 183 approaches over almost three centuries from April 1900 to November 2198.

On 19 November 2069, it will pass  from Earth, which will be the asteroid's second closest approach after its record flyby on 21 November 2019.

Numbering and naming 

This minor planet was numbered by the Minor Planet Center on 12 January 2017. As of 2020 it has not been named.

Physical characteristics 

During its apparition in November 2007, spectro-photometric data obtained of  allowed for an A/S/D-type classification. This classification could be further constrained to an A/S-type, as a D-type does not agree with the object's relatively high albedo value (see below).

Rotation period 

Lightcurve analysis gave a rotation period of  hours with a very high brightness amplitude of  magnitude, indicative of a highly elongated non-spherical shape.

Diameter and albedo 

The Collaborative Asteroid Lightcurve Link assumes an albedo of 0.20 and a diameter of 0.311 kilometers using an absolute magnitude of 19.9 as well.

References

External links 
 An asteroid as large as 2,000 feet across will speed past Earth later this month, bgr.com, 6 November 2019
 NEO Earth Close Approaches, CNEOS – Center for Near Earth Object Studies
 Near-Earth Asteroid Lightcurve Analysis at the Center for Solar System Studies: 2018 July-September, Brian D. Warner, Robert D. Stephens, The Minor Planet Bulletin, January 2019
 
 
 

481394
481394
481394
20060917